Pamalon is a village in Homalin Township, Hkamti District, in the Sagaing Region of northwestern Burma. Pamalon lies on the Chindwin River to the west of Homalin.

References

External links
Maplandia World Gazetteer

Populated places in Hkamti District
Homalin Township